Snook, Snooks, or Snoek may refer to:

Fishes 
 Family Centropomidae (snooks)
 Common snook
 Family Esocidae (pikes)
 Haplochromis insidiae
 Northern pike
 Family Gempylidae (snake mackerels)
 Blacksail snake mackerel or black snoek
 Thyrsites ("snoek", popular in the Cape region of South Africa, this was also consumed in the United Kingdom during World War II)
 Family Muraenesocidae (pike congers)
 Pike eel
 Family Percidae (perches)
 Family Scombridae (mackerels, tunas, bonitos), subfamily: Scombrinae
 Kanadi kingfish
 Narrow-barred Spanish mackerel, Scomberomorus commerson
 Barracuda
 Australian barracuda, Sphyraena novaehollandiae
 Cutlassfish
 Silver scabbardfish
 Petenia splendida, bay snook
 Southern sennet, Sphyraena picudilla
 Snook shark or Caribbean sharpnose shark, Rhizoprionodon porosus

Places

United States
 Rancho San Bernardo (Snook), a Mexican land grant in present-day San Diego County, California
 Snook, Pennsylvania, an unincorporated community
 Snook, Texas, a city

People 
Snook (surname), multiple people with this name, or variations Snooks, Snookes etc.
Snoek (surname), multiple people with this name, or variations Snoeck, Snoeks etc.

Art, entertainment, and media

Fictional entities
 A fictional sloth and the main character in the children's television show It's a Big Big World
 A skunk who is a one-shot character in the episode "Smellorama" on Bear in the Big Blue House

Music
 Snook (band), a rap group based in Sweden

Transportation 
 Audi Snook, a single-wheeled concept vehicle
 USS Snook, United States Navy ships